The Mlanje Mountain chameleon (Nadzikambia mlanjensis) is one of two species in the genus Nadzikambia (derived from the species' name in Chichewa). It is a plesiomorphic, small chameleon from the Ruo Gorge forest on Mount Mulanje in Malawi.

Initially placed into Chamaeleo, it was for some time moved to the South African dwarf chameleons (Bradypodion) by some (Klaver & Böhme, 1986). This was criticized because plesiomorphies cannot be used to define clades, and eventually turned out to be in error.

References

  (1986): Phylogeny and classification of the Chamaeleonidae (Sauria) with special reference to hemipenis morphology. Bonner Zoologische Monographien 22: 1–64.
  (2007): Corrections to species names recently placed in Kinyongia and Nadzikambia (Reptilia: Chamaeleonidae). Zootaxa 1426: 68.
 http://www.chameleoninfo.com/Species_Profiles.html

Nadzikambia
Reptiles described in 1965
Taxa named by Donald George Broadley